"Possession / My All For You" Jyongri's first single and Double-A single to be released in Japan under EMI Music Japan on December 13, 2006. "Possession/My All For You" debut at #16 on Oricon Weekly Single Charts and sold 7,572 within the first week. This single chart for total of 6 week and currently sold a grand total of 23,049 copies.

Summary
"Possession" was released in two languages (English and Japanese) and being used as the November–December ending themes for "Itadaki Muscle" and "Super Chample," as well as the "Ongaku Senshi MUSIC FIGHTER" ending theme for November. While "My All For You" is being used as "Gokujou no Getsuyoru's" ending theme.

Track listing
 Possession
 My All For You
 Possession (English Version)
 Possession (Chris Paul Club Remix)
 Re-Possessed (Possession-Chris Paul Dub Mix)
 Possession -Instrumental- 
 My All For You -Instrumental-
 Possession (Vocal Track)
 My All For You (Vocal Track)

Charts

Oricon sales chart (Japan)

References

2007 singles